Isle of Axholme was a rural district in Lincolnshire, Parts of Lindsey from 1894 to 1974.  It was formed under the Local Government Act 1894 based on the Lincolnshire parts of the Thorne rural sanitary district and two parishes of the Goole RSD (covering the northern part of the Isle of Axholme).

After the abolition of Crowle Urban District and taking in some parishes from the Gainsborough Rural District in 1936, it covered all of the Isle.

It was abolished in 1974 under the Local Government Act 1972 and went to form part of the Boothferry district of Humberside.  Since 1996 it has been incorporated in the unitary authority of North Lincolnshire.

Civil parishes
The rural district contained the following civil parishes over its existence:
Althorpe (until 1958: merged with Keadby CP)
Amcotts
Belton
Crowle (from 1936, previously a separate urban district)
Eastoft
Epworth
Garthorpe
Haxey (from 1936, previously in Gainsborough RD)
Keadby (until 1958: merged with Althorpe CP)
Keadby with Althorpe (formed by merger of 2 CPs in 1958)
Luddington
Owston Ferry (from 1936, previously in Gainsborough RD)
West Butterwick (from 1936, previously in Gainsborough RD)
Wroot

References

External links
 Isle of Axholme RD (Vision of Britain), retrieved 30 December 2007
Isle of Axholme website

Rural districts of Lindsey
Districts of England created by the Local Government Act 1894
Districts of England abolished by the Local Government Act 1972